Billel Naïli (born June 15, 1986 in El Harrach, Algiers) is an Algerian footballer who is currently playing for USM El Harrach in the Algerian Ligue Professionnelle 2.

Club career

JS Kabylie
On July 10, 2010, Naïli signed a one-year contract with JS Kabylie, joining them on a free transfer from USM El Harrach. On July 16, 2010, he made his official debut for the club, in a 2010 CAF Champions League group stage game against Egyptian club Ismaily SC. Naïli came on as a substitute in the 65th minute as JSK went on to win the game 1-0.

CR Belouizdad
On July 21, 2011, Naïli joined CR Belouizdad.

Suspension
In February 2019, Billal Naïli was suspended on a provisional basis after a doping charge, while playing for USM El Harrach. Naïli dropped a bombshell in his first reaction and claimed to have never been the subject of doping control. The test was positive for cocaine.

Honours
 Won the Algerian Cup once with JS Kabylie in 2011

References

External links
 DZFoot.com La Fiche de Billal NAÏLI
 

1986 births
Living people
People from El Harrach
Algerian footballers
JS Kabylie players
USM El Harrach players
CR Belouizdad players
Algerian Ligue Professionnelle 1 players
Association football midfielders
21st-century Algerian people